The Oldbury rock shelters are a complex of Middle Palaeolithic sites situated on the slopes of Oldbury hillfort near Ightham in the English county of Kent.

They were occupied by Mousterian flint tool manufacturers around 50,000 years ago and examples of their characteristic bout-coupé handaxes were found there during excavations in the nineteenth and twentieth centuries.

The site is open to the public and owned by the National Trust.

References

19th-century archaeological discoveries
Archaeological sites in Kent
Tonbridge and Malling
Rock shelters
Mousterian